The United States Pirate Party (USPP) is an American political party founded in 2006 by Brent Allison and Alex English. The party's platform is aligned with the global Pirate movement, and supports reform of copyright laws to reflect open source and free culture values, government transparency,  protection of privacy and civil liberties. The United States Pirate Party also advocates for evidence-based policy, egalitarianism, meritocracy and the hacker ethic as well as the rolling back of corporate personhood and corporate welfare. The USPP has also made a priority to advocate for changes in the copyright laws and removal of patents. It is the belief of the party that these restrictions greatly hinder the sharing and expansion of knowledge and resources.

The party's national organization has existed in multiple incarnations since its 2006 founding. Its most recent is the Pirate National Committee (PNC), formed in 2012 as a coalition of state parties. The PNC officially recognizes Pirate parties from 10 states, and tracks and assists in the growth of more state parties throughout the United States. The board of the USPP is the board of the PNC. The chair of the Pirate National Committee is known as the "Captain". The current Captain is Anthony Jay.

History
The Pirate Party was founded in June 2006 by University of Georgia graduate student Brent Allison in response to the success of the Swedish Pirate Party. Its platform was focused primarily on copyright reform and freedom from Internet censorship. The party first attempted to register in Utah during the 2007/2008 election cycle and failed to collect the required number of Statements of Support. In 2011, the Massachusetts Pirate Party became the first legally recognized Pirate Party in the US. By 2011, the Pirate Party reported over 3000 members nationwide.

In 2012, a coalition of state Pirate parties formed the Pirate National Committee (PNC). By July of that year, the PNC drafted and adopted a new constitution, which outlined a broader ideology inspired by Rick Falkvinge's Pirate Wheel.

In 2015, Massachusetts Pirate Party Quartermaster Steve Revilak became the first pirate in the United States to be elected to office, elected to Arlington town meeting.

On July 2, 2022, the United States Pirate Party became a member of the Pirate Parties International, an umbrella organization, comprising 31 parties all over the world at the time of the USPP's admission.

Ethan Osborne, captain of the Kentucky Pirate Party, ran for Congress in Kentucky's 4th congressional district during the 2022 United States House of Representatives elections, finishing in 3rd place with over 10,000 votes or 3.9%. This is the largest amount of votes for a Pirate candidate in US history as of 2022.

Name

The Pirate Party defends their oft-criticized name in the preamble of the PNC's constitution:

Ideology
Factions within the Pirate Party include left-libertarians, classical liberals, anarchists, progressives, and radical centrists. Many Pirates explicitly decline to identify with any particular political ideology or philosophy. They are driven to "do what works" rather than being driven by a particular ideology.

The Pirate Party's platform originally centered on issues of copyright. "Like its international counterparts, the USPP's main practical concerns are digital intellectual property and privacy laws—specifically, the abolition of a 1998 digital U.S. copyright law, the reduction of copyrights to 14 years (from 95 years after publication, or 70 years after the author's death), and the expiration of patents that don't result in significant progress within four years (as opposed to 20 years)."

In 2012, the party began an expansion of its platform, inspired by the Pirate Wheel. The party emphasizes the cultural values of the hacker ethic, open source and free culture, strong protection of individual civil liberties, government transparency, participatory governance, and evidence-based policy. It solidified these tenets by publishing a series of essays in January 2012 where it voiced its values using quotations from historical figures, including Benjamin Franklin ("They who can give up essential liberty to obtain a little temporary safety, deserve neither liberty nor safety"), Mark Twain ("Only one thing is impossible for God: to find any sense in any copyright law on the planet"), Albert Camus ("The only way to deal with an un-free world is to become so absolutely free that your very existence is an act of rebellion") and Thomas Jefferson ("Timid men prefer the calm of despotism to the tempestuous sea of liberty.") in order to highlight the timelessness, urgency, and consensual agreement on its positions related to free culture.

PNC

Captain 
Before 2012, the chairman of the party was elected every July by a membership vote, as established in the party constitution. After the 2012 formation of the PNC, the role's name was changed to Captain.

 Norton stepped down mid-term to head up Pirate Parties International. Kerbein, as operations officer, stepped into the position for the rest of the term.

 Martin was removed via a vote of no confidence on December 29, 2009. Hall was selected as administrator pro tempore for a 30-day period until elections could be held.

 See Wikinews interview with Peter Coti.

 Norton resigned in order to have more time to devote to other interests.

Officers 
 Chair – Anthony Jay
 Vice Chair – Vacant
 Treasurer - Joseph Onoroski
 Secretary – Rose Klein
 State Moderator - Vacant
 Auditor - James O’Keefe
 Swarmcare Manager - Mitch Davilo
 Director of Public Relations - Brianna Coyle
 Webmaster - Vacant

State parties

See also
 Copyright in the United States
 List of United States political parties
 Patent pirate

References

External links
 Official Website
 Official USPP Wiki

Pirate parties
Political parties in the United States
Political parties established in 2006
2006 establishments in the United States
Pan-Americanism